Daouda Sow is a name. People with that name include:
Daouda Sow (1933–2009), Senegalese politician and legislator
Daouda Sow (born 1983), French boxer

Sow, Daouda